Falsamblesthis pilula is a species of beetle in the family Cerambycidae. It was described by Galileo and Martins in 1987. It is known from Colombia.

References

Forsteriini
Beetles described in 1987